Albert Frederick Hans Oeming (April 9, 1925 – March 17, 2014) was a Canadian wildlife conservationist, zoologist, professional wrestler and wrestling promoter. Oeming co-founded the professional wrestling promotion Stampede Wrestling and owned the largest game farm in North America.

Early life
Oeming was born on April 9, 1925 in Edmonton to Albert and Elspeth Oeming, who had immigrated to Canada from Germany.

Professional wrestling career
Oeming wrestled for the Capitol Wrestling Corporation in the 1940s on the urging of his boyhood neighbor Stu Hart whom he also served in the Royal Canadian Navy together with during World War Two. He later co-founded the Stampede Wrestling promotion with Hart in 1948.

Nature activism
Oeming was the Edmonton Zoological Society's inaugural president. He sought and rescued rare and endangered wild animals, particularly in northern and western Canada. Oeming toured the country attending schools with his tame cheetah Tawana to educate children about wildlife. In the 1980s Oeming starred in the television mini-series Al Oeming – Man of the North.

Oeming sometimes also loaned out some of his animals to the Disney company to use in their nature films.

Personal life
Oeming was married twice, first to May Dorothy Dennistoun in 1950 and then to Gina Mrklas in 1978.

Championships and accomplishments
Canadian Wrestling Hall of Fame
Class of 2014

Works published

Novels 
 A Visit to Al Oeming's Alberta Game Farm (Commercial Printers Limited, Edmonton, 1963).

Articles 
 Notes on the barred owl and snowy owl in Alberta (Nature Saskatchewan BlueJay Journal, Vol. 15 No. 4 - December 1, 1957).
 Goshawk Trapping in Alberta (Nature Saskatchewan BlueJay Journal, Vol. 16 No. 1 - March 1958)
 A Herd Of Musk-Oxen, Ovibos moschatus, in captivity (International Zoo Yearbook, Vol. 5 Issue 1 - January 1965).
 A Further Note On The Herd Of Musk-Oxen Ovibos moschatus at Alberta Game Farm (International Zoo Yearbook, Vol. 6 Issue 1 - January 1966)
 Notes On The Care and Nutrition of North American Sheep in Captivity (International Zoo Yearbook, Vol. 6 Issue 1 - January 1966).

See also
 Animals in professional wrestling

References

Further reading

External links
 Al Oeming's profiles at, Cagematch.net and Wrestlingdata.com
 Obituary at Legacy.com

1925 births
2014 deaths
Canadian male professional wrestlers
Wildlife conservation in Canada
Canadian people of German descent
Stampede Wrestling alumni
Professional wrestling promoters
Royal Canadian Navy personnel of World War II
Canadian military personnel from Alberta